Hercules is a 1983 Italian-American science fantasy adventure film written and directed by Luigi Cozzi and starring Lou Ferrigno. The film is based on Greek mythology and follows the exploits of Hercules. Ferrigno repeated his role in the 1985 sequel, The Adventures of Hercules.

Plot
The film is a retelling of the story of Hercules (Lou Ferrigno) battling the wizard King Minos (William Berger), who uses "science" in an attempt to take over the world. Hercules must stop him and rescue his princess love in the process.

Cast

Additional Cast
Giovanni Cianfriglia
Mindi Miller

Production
Variety announced in 1982 that actor Lou Ferrigno would play the title role in Hercules and budgeted the film at $6 million. The film was based on a screenplay by Ricardo Ghione. Principal photography was scheduled to begin May 1982 in Rome, Italy while The Hollywood Reporter named Claudio Fragasso as screenwriter, and Ennio Morricone as music composer and conductor. Neither Mattei, Fragasso, or Morricone appear in onscreen credits. The Hollywood Reporter later stated that principal photography began on August 1982 in Italy under the direction of writer/director Luigi Cozzi, who previously worked on a low-budget space opera Starcrash (1978).

Hercules tries to merge two contradictory genres — peplum and science fiction. It features two sword-and-sandal veterans — Brad Harris and Gianni Garko — cast in supporting roles. Film historian Gary Allen Smith noted that the movie contradicts Greek mythology, as the titular character is an orphaned son of the king of Thebes. The mythological Twelve Labours of Hercules are hardly ever displayed in the film, notably when Hercules is cleaning the Augean stables. The film's science-based features include mechanical monsters and robots, and the screenplay itself is inspired by Star Wars, The Colossus of Rhodes, and Atlantis, the Lost Continent. According to Andrew Adler of The Courier-Journal the film was influenced by epic cinema but is "so haphazardly structured it could have been shot in a week". Lawrence Van Gelder classified Hercules as an action movie.

Filmed back-to-back with The Seven Magnificent Gladiators in Italy in 1982. The Seven Magnificent Gladiators was filmed first, followed by the shooting of Hercules, which began on 12 July 1982. The filming was supposed to start earlier, as Roger Ebert noted in his article from May 1982, but was postponed for several weeks when "difficulties with the special effects" occurred. Lou Ferrigno underwent sword training before the production began. Before he left to work in Italy, he also went through torturous physical trainings in order to build the perfect musculature, assisted by Joe Weider. He later admitted he was in the best condition of his entire life when the shooting occurred.

In his September 1982 interview for Muscle & Fitness, Ferrigno explained he idolized Hercules and fellow bodybuilder-turned-actor Steve Reeves ever since he was a child. He stated that he signed the contract for Hercules five days after the role was offered to him, even though previously he had examined and rejected a number of different projects. The actor elaborated: "Playing Hercules means more to me than playing the Hulk. Honestly, it means more to me than winning the Mr. Olympia contest. Hercules is my all-time fantasy hero."

Lead actors Ferrigno and Sybil Danning got along poorly during the extended shooting schedule. When Danning went on the tour to promote the film, she let her dislike of Ferrigno be known to anyone who interviewed her. She claimed that he had her role reduced and switched from love interest to that of the villain due to their differences.

Release

Hercules was released in the United States on 26 August 1983 with a 98-minute running time. It opened at Showcase Cinemas, and has been theatrically distributed by Cannon Films and MGM. Besides being released to movie theaters, it has also been screened at drive-in cinemas. The film ranked fourth in the United States box office in its opening weekend, earning $3,473,635. The film ultimately grossed $11 million. It is the nineteenth most successful film released by The Cannon Group.

The film was released on August 12, 1983 in Germany.

Critical reception

Original theatrical reviews
The film received largely negative reviews from critics. Lawrence Van Gelder of The New York Times believed that — as in The Incredible Hulk — Ferrigno "is once again called upon mainly to flex his inflated muscles and lend himself to the sometimes less than special effects". According to Chris Walters from Austin American-Statesman, the film relies too heavily on "muscle stunts and old-fashioned optical effects". The critic also thought that Ferrigno's "total lack of acting ability" is "more or less compensated for by a really expressive set of pectoral muscles". The Boston Globe'''s Jay Carr wrote that the film "modeled itself after Clash of the Titans", which separated it from many Star Wars rip-offs of its time. Carr noted that Ferrigno's Hercules is not a "dumb beefcake" but also remarked that the actor's "copiously muscled body looks unreal". Writing for The Pittsburgh Press, Ed Blank shared similar sentiments: he called the film a "chintzy rerun of Clash of the Titans", and noticed that Ferrigno "flexes his bulging pectorals more than 100 times onscreen". Andrew Adler from The Courier-Journal believed that the film's special effects "would have looked silly in a Buck Rogers serial of the 1930s". Adler's critique towards Lou Ferrigno was mixed — he thought that Ferrigno's "interpretation rarely goes beyond flexing his pectorals, but at least he looks earnest".

Marylynn Uricchio, a film critic for the Pittsburgh Post-Gazette, criticized the narration and the dialogue but applauded the leading actor. She wrote: "Ferrigno's only requirement is to arrange his face in the appropriate expression, and this he does well". On the other hand, Henry Edgar from Daily Press called Ferrigno's leading role "a major flaw", yet labelled the film as "a lavish spectacle", "packed with action and color in epic proportions". Of Ferrigno he said: "his massive body can’t compensate for the lack of expertise".

Ben Steelman of Star-News lambasted the film for its "tacky" special effects, including the "metallic robot creatures, which make noises like popular video games". He noted that, "as beefcake, Ferrigno makes Arnold Schwarzenegger look like a 90-pound weakling, and he flexes his pectorals frequently. Obviously, he is supposed to appeal to the mommies in the audience." Kansas City critic Robert C. Trussell gave the film one star, calling it even less satisfying than "low-budget Italian-made mythological epics of two decades ago". He pointed that Ferrigno mostly just "grunts, puffs, sweats and flexes in the title role". In his review for the Tallahassee Democrat Steve Watkins observed that "Ferrigno is a bodybuilder extraordinaire; he’s a Hulk, he’s even a Hercules, but he’s no actor".

Contemporary
On Rotten Tomatoes, the film has a 25% rating based on 8 reviews, with an average rating of 2.2/10. However, over the years Hercules has become a cult movie.

Leonard Maltin briefly reviewed Hercules in his 2015 film guide. He called the movie "silly" and "special-effects-laden", but aimed praise towards Lou Ferrigno, mentioning that "the ex-Incredible Hulk is undeniably well cast". In the official write-up for the Smithee Awards website, Bryan Cassidy noted that the film "is avant-garde to the point of being particularly ludicrous". He said that "if anyone's going to play Hercules, Lou Ferrigno pops right to mind", but also stated that the actor "can't really emote well". AllMovie's critic Eleanor Mannikka panned the film for its "off-color" stage sets and low-budget execution, summarizing it as a "difficult challenge to conquer".

In 2012, Andy Brack of Charleston City Paper opined that "Kevin Sorbo, Arnold Schwarzenegger, and Steve Reeves’ takes on the titular Grecian beefcake can’t touch Ferrigno’s". The critic praised the film for its "brawn, bunk effects, and dialogue worthy of a good round of alcohol-induced Mystery Science Theater 3000-style riffing". Gary Allen Smith remarks in his book, Epic Films, that "the production design [of the film] is imaginative, considering the limitations of the budget, but the visuals are often marred by poor quality of the special effects". The author also praises the main star's physical strength and aesthetics: "At 6'5" and 262 pounds, Lou Ferrigno is a massive and thoroughly convincing Hercules". Decider's Meghan O'Keefe named Ferrigno the tenth "hottest onscreen Hercules", calling him "well-greased".

Accolades

Sequel
The film's sequel, The Adventures of Hercules, was released in Italy on May 2, 1985 and in the United States on October 4, 1985. It has been announced in the Summer of 1983, when the original premiered — its working title was The Return of Hercules''.

See also 
 List of Italian films of 1983

Notes

References

Footnotes

Sources

External links
 
 
 
 

1980s fantasy adventure films
1983 multilingual films
1983 films
American fantasy adventure films
American multilingual films
Cultural depictions of bodybuilders
English-language Italian films
Films about Heracles
Films directed by Luigi Cozzi
Films produced by Menahem Golan
Films produced by Yoram Globus
Films scored by Pino Donaggio
Films set in Greece
Films shot in Rome
Films using stop-motion animation
Golan-Globus films
Golden Raspberry Award winning films
Italian fantasy adventure films
1980s Italian-language films
Italian multilingual films
Metro-Goldwyn-Mayer films
Peplum films
Science fantasy films
Sword and sandal films
United Artists films
1980s American films
1980s Italian films